Sun Power  is the second album by Dayton, Ohio  funk band  Sun

Track listing
Light Me Up 	4:07 	
Boogie Bopper 	3:20 	
We're So Hot 	4:28 	
Conscience 	4:41 	
Time Is Passing 	7:11 	
Just A Minute Of Your Time 	3:11 	
Organ Grinder 	3:53 	
She Lives Alone 	5:29

Personnel
Byron Byrd - Lead and Backing Vocals, Bass, Trombone, Alto, Baritone and Soporano Saxophone
Chris Jones - Lead and Backing Vocals, Cornet, Percussion, Trumpet, Vibraphone
Dean Hummons - Flute, Keyboards, Organ, Piano, Backing Vocals
Kym Yancey - Drums, Percussion, Backing Vocals
John Wagner - Lead and Backing Vocals, Flugelhorn, Percussion, Piano, Trombone, Trumpet
Shawn Sandridge - Lead and Backing Vocals, Electric Guitar, Keyboards
Gary King - Percussion, Trombone, Backing Vocals

Charts

Singles

External links
 Sun-Sun Power at Discogs

References

1977 albums
Sun (R&B band) albums
Capitol Records albums